The Elbrus-8S is a Russian 28 nanometer 8-core microprocessor developed by Moscow Center of SPARC Technologies (MCST). The first prototypes were produced by the end of 2014 and serial production started in 2016. The Elbrus-8S is to be used in servers and workstations. The processor's architecture allows support of up to 32 processors on a single server motherboard.

In 2018 MCST announced plans to produce the Elbrus-8SV, an upgraded version of the 8C with doubled performance. The CPU can process 576 Gflops and has a frequency of 1.5 GHz, as well as DDR4 support instead of DDR3. Engineering samples were already completed in Q3 2017. Development was completed in 2019 and its fabrication started in 2020.

In 2021 the processor was offered to Sberbank, Russia's largest bank, for evaluation in light of a potential use for some of the company's hardware needs. The evaluation had a negative outcome, as the functional requirements were not met.

Supported operating systems
The Elbrus-8S and -SV processors support binary compatibility with Intel x86 and x86-64 processors via runtime binary translation. The documentation suggests that the processors can run Windows XP and Windows 7. The processors can also run a Linux kernel based OS compiled for Elbrus.

Elbrus Elbrus-8S information

Elbrus Elbrus-8SV information

References

External links
 Official MCST announcements 
 Data provided by MCST

Very long instruction word computing
X86 microprocessors
VLIW microprocessors